The 2002–03 season saw West Ham United relegated from the FA Premier League (known as the FA Barclaycard Premiership for sponsorship reasons) after a 10 year run in the top flight. West Ham were relegated to the First Division at the end of the season, finishing in 18th place.

Season summary
Following a successful debut campaign for new manager Glenn Roeder the previous year that saw them finish 7th in the Premiership - two places short of a club record 5th three seasons earlier - hopes were high for the young squad to expand on this and aim for an equal or higher finish in the 2002–03 season. Despite boasting several current or future England internationals, including David James, Trevor Sinclair, Joe Cole, Jermain Defoe, Glen Johnson and Michael Carrick, a disastrous start to the season saw them win just three out of their first 24 matches, and the club found themselves bottom of the table at Christmas with just 16 points. Similarly poor results followed into the new year, as the club continued to struggle in the relegation battle and were knocked out of the FA Cup after a 6–0 defeat to Manchester United in January.

Their poor form in all competitions was put into perspective on 21 April 2003, when manager Glenn Roeder collapsed after a 1–0 Premiership win against Middlesbrough; it was revealed he was suffering from a non-malignant brain tumour, which was later operated on successfully. Following this, club legend Sir Trevor Brooking was named as caretaker manager, and West Ham's luck began to turn with a series of good results towards the end of the season that saw them go into the final day with a chance of staying up. Tied with 17th place Bolton Wanderers but far behind on goal difference, they headed into the last game of the season against Birmingham City needing at least a 7 goal win to be sure of escaping relegation. However, a 2–2 draw with goals from Les Ferdinand and Paolo Di Canio saw the Hammers relegated after Bolton defeated Middlesbrough 2–1 at the Reebok Stadium, sending them down to England's second division for the first time since 1992.

Final league table

Squad

Left club during season

Results

Premier League

League Cup

FA Cup

Statistics

Overview

Goalscorers

League position by matchday

Appearances and goals

|-
! colspan=12 style=background:#dcdcdc; text-align:center| Goalkeepers

|-
! colspan=12 style=background:#dcdcdc; text-align:center| Defenders

|-
! colspan=12 style=background:#dcdcdc; text-align:center| Midfielders

|-
! colspan=12 style=background:#dcdcdc; text-align:center| Forwards

|}

Transfers

In

Out

References

West Ham United F.C. seasons
West Ham United
West Ham United
West Ham United